Rini Khanna (born 1964) is an Indian television news anchor, who worked with state-run Doordarshan (1985 – 2001) which made her well known, and later started a career as voiceover professional and anchor person for various events. She started her career as a newscaster with All India Radio in 1982.

Early life and education
She studied in nine schools in Delhi, Halwara (Punjab), Mumbai, Jodhpur, Bagdogra, Tambaram and back in Delhi. She finished her schooling at the Air Force School at Subroto Park, Delhi in 1981. Thereafter she graduated in English literature from Jesus and Mary College, Delhi University,  and did her post graduation in History and also did a PG diploma in Journalism from Indian Institute of Mass Communication (IIMC), New Delhi.

Career
At 13, Khanna began producing and hosting programmes and interviews on India’s National Radio, All India Radio and was soon reading the primetime national news on All India Radio. In addition she does commentary on occasions including Independence day, Republic day etc. for television and radio.

She was handpicked from Radio to anchor the National news on Delhi Doordarshan, the premier Indian television channel in 1985, co-anchoring news with Tejeshwar Singh.

Khanna is an voice talent, rendering commentary and voiceovers for documentaries, advt films and feature-films. She also anchors international and national conferences, cultural shows and seminars for organisations, UN agencies, corporate groups and Government agencies.

Khanna has also given the female voice over for the Delhi Metro along with male voice over of Shammi Narang.

Personal life
Khanna is married to businessman Deepak Khanna. The couple lives in Vasant Kunj, New Delhi and have a 26-year-old son, Sahil Khanna.

References

External links
 

Indian television news anchors
1964 births
Living people
Delhi University alumni
Doordarshan journalists
Indian women radio presenters
Indian radio presenters
All India Radio people
Indian voice actresses
People from Delhi
Kendriya Vidyalaya alumni
Masters of ceremonies
Indian women television presenters
Actresses in Malayalam television
Indian television actresses
Actresses from Kerala
Indian women television journalists
Journalists from Kerala
20th-century Indian journalists
20th-century Indian women writers
Women writers from Kerala
All India Radio women
Indian radio journalists
Delhi Metro